Time at the Top, is a 1999 cable television film for Showtime that was directed by Jimmy Kaufman and written by Linda Brookover and Alain Silver based on the book by Edward Ormondroyd. It stars Elisha Cuthbert, Timothy Busfield, and Lynne Adams.

Synopsis

Susan Shawson (Elisha Cuthbert), a 13-year old high-school, inadvertently travels back in time in her apartment building's elevator. As altered by Dr. Reynolds (Michael Sinelnikoff), a retired physicist living upstairs, this secret time machine transports Susan from New York of 1998 back to exactly the same spot in 1881. There she meets Victoria Walker (Gabrielle Boni), a girl her age in need of assistance with her own family problems, most notably a schemer named Cyrus Sweeney (Jean LeClerc) trying to take advantage of her widowed mother Nora (Lynne Adams).

When she returns to the present, Susan discovers that her widower father Frank (Timothy Busfield) has been frantically searching for her, assisted by neighbor Edward Ormondroyd (Richard Jutras) and local police detective Gagin (Charles Edwin Powell). Gradually discovering the power of time travel, Susan, Victoria, and her young brother Robert (Matthew Harbour), travel back and forth in time and succeed in changing both the past and the future.

Cast
 Timothy Busfield as Frank Shawson 
 Elisha Cuthbert as Susan Shawson 
 Gabrielle Boni as Victoria Walker
 Lynne Adams as Nora Walker/Nina Shawson
 Matthew Harbour as Robert Walker 
 Jean LeClerc as Cyrus Sweeney
 Richard Jutras as Edward Ormondroyd
 Michael Sinelnikoff as Dr. Reynolds
 Charles Edwin Powell as Detective Gagin
 Howard Rosenstein as Austin
 Michel Perron as Mr. Bodoni
 Nadia Verrucci as Mrs. McLernon

Production
Time at the Top was part of Showtime's reported commitment to "producing original family-oriented films" in 1998–99, as part of their "Original Pictures for All Ages" franchise. The script, written by Linda Brookover and Alain Silver, was based on a novel by Edward Ormondroyd.

Reception
Los Angeles Times critic Don Heckman reviewed the film as "predictable" and a "bit heavy-handed at times", with a "slogging sort of pace", though Heckman praised Cuthbert's performance as Susan as "skillfully portrayed".

Accolades
Time at the Top was awarded the Certificate of Merit as a Finalist in the Houston World Film Festival and also The Film Advisory Board's Award of Excellence. It was in competition at the Cairo International Film Festival and Falstaff International Film Festival and also screened at the Festival of Festivals, Saint Petersburg

Home media
Showtime licensed video rights for Time at the Top to Square Dog Pictures, a subsidiary of Blockbuster Video, which printed hundreds of VHS copies in order to fill enough shelves at Blockbuster Video locations to make a given title as if it were a major release.

References

External links
 

1999 television films
1999 films
American television films
American science fiction comedy films
Films about time travel
Films set in 1998
Films set in 1881
1990s American films